Paranoia (also released under the title of  ) is the second studio album by Nikolai Noskov, released in 1999 in Russia.

Album information and production 
All music written by Nikolai Noskov unless otherwise stated.

Track listing

External links
 Paranoia

References 

Nikolai Noskov albums
1999 albums
Russian-language albums